Viticulture is a worker placement board game published by Stonemaier Games in 2013. The game's design was crowdfunded via a campaign on Kickstarter, with the concept of players building an Italian vineyard. Upon its release, Viticulture received praise for its engagement, but its luck was critiqued. Several expansions and reprints were later released.

Gameplay
In Viticulture, players operate a traditional Tuscan vineyard. Each round of the game represents one year of operation divided into four seasons.

Rounds begin with a spring turn, when the player chooses a location in the wake-up track that provides various benefits. This is followed by summer, during which players place workers on the summer action spaces in the shared board, which enable a player to plant vines, sell grapes, gain money through tours, play a summer visitor card, draw a vine card, erect structures, which allow grapes to be planted, vines to be aged, and awarding additional victory points. In the autumn turn, players draw either a summer visitor card, which helps improve the site, or a winter visitor card, which enables the player to harvest their vineyard. The winter turn also allows each player places workers in the winter action spaces, which enable the player to harvest a field, process grapes, fill wine orders, hire an additional worker, or draw a winter visitor card. A round is completed when players age their grape and wine tokens, collect their workers, and collect any accrued income.

When a grape is planted in the fields of the individual boards, it could subsequently be harvested as grape tokens. Those tokens are processed and moved to the wine cellar, which award victory points through filling orders. When twenty points is reached for one player, the game ends after the season is completed, and the player with the most points is the winner.

Expansions and versions
The first expansion set, released in May 2013 with the original version of the game, is called Arboriculture. The expansion set Tuscany was also funded via Kickstarter. The latter introduced a greater breadth of options for players to score victory points. It also created an asymmetric start to the game providing players with different options to establish their wine-making business.

An app version of the game was created by Digidiced.

Tuscany
The Tuscany expansion set includes numerous modular additions to the base game. The Grande Worker module allows a player to place a worker on any action even if that move is not available at the time, eliminating the possibility that players miss necessary actions. It was later incorporated into the base game. The Mamas and Papas module varies the resources with which players start the game. The Properties module enables a player to sell a parcel of land for cash, which is difficult to acquire in the early phases of the base game.

Other modules in the expansion set include Patronage, Advanced Visitors cards, New Visitors cards, and Structures cards. The latter enables a player to erect up to two special structures that add a victory point to the player's score and also provide additional game options for the player, such as a new action, a recurring bonus, or a residual at the end of each round.

The Extended Board module replaces the main game board. It is a significant modification of the original board, with actions and bonuses shifted. It modifies the season and player wake-up track, and changes the game-ending condition to 25 victory points, as there are more ways in which players can earn them.

The expansion also includes the Arboriculture and Formaggio expansions, which allow players to make fruits, olive oil, and cheese, as well as Mafia.

The module Special Workers adds numerous worker types to the game, each with additional functions but also usable as standard workers. These are the chef, farmer, innkeeper, mafioso, merchant, messenger, oracle, politico, professore, soldato, and traveller.

The Tuscany Essential Edition was later released in 2016, with only the three modules, the Extended Board, Special workers, and Structures, other variants were implemented in the Essential Edition.

Viticulture Essential Edition 
In 2015, the Viticulture Essential Edition was released. It includes several expansion sets in Tuscany, including the Grande Worker, Mamas and Papas, Properties, Advanced Visitors cards, and the single-player Automa variant.

Other Expansions 
Several new visitor card sets, including the Moor Visitor and Visits from the Rhine Valley, were also released for the game.

Viticulture World 
In 2022, Viticulture World, a co-operative expansion for the base game, was released. It also includes six different card decks, with different rules and events. The Finnish review website Lautapeliopas praised its components, engagement, strategy, and replayability, but criticised the card draw introducing luck elements that affects the difficulty.

Reception 
Dave Banks, in a review for Wired, described the game as "wonderfully fun". In a review for Punchboard Media, Charles Hasegawa states that the game has a few flaws, particularly luck associated with drawing cards and that in the early phases of the game each player is "trying to do very similar things" with minor variation. He also described the Tuscany expansion as "a masterpiece of changes that turn an ok game into a more varied and more complex game".

By 2018, the game was ranked in the top 25 of all board games at BoardGameGeek.

References

Further reading

External links

Viticulture at Stonemaier Games

Board games introduced in 2013